The Buffalo Sabres are a professional ice hockey team based in Buffalo, New York. They are members of the Atlantic Division in the Eastern Conference of the National Hockey League (NHL). There have been 20 head coaches of the Buffalo Sabres since the team's debut in the 1970–71 NHL season.

Punch Imlach, Scotty Bowman, Marcel Pronovost, Roger Neilson and Phil Housley have all made it to the Hockey Hall of Fame, while Bowman, Lindy Ruff, Dan Bylsma and Ted Nolan have all won the Jack Adams Award, an honor given annually to the National Hockey League coach "adjudged to have contributed the most to his team's success" (Bylsma and Bowman won their awards with other teams). The first head coach, Hall of Famer Punch Imlach, has the lowest winning percentage of any Sabres coach, with a .370 winning percentage during his 120-game tenure. Ron Rolston is a close second with a .372 win percentage in his two partial seasons with the team (compared equally, Rolston would have a worse record since many of Rolston's wins came in shootouts, which did not exist in Imlach's era).

The Sabres have made two appearances in the Stanley Cup Finals, losing four games to two against the Philadelphia Flyers in 1975, under Smith, and again four to two against the Dallas Stars in 1999, under Ruff. Ruff has led the Sabres into the playoffs seven times.

Seven of the team's head coaches played for the Sabres during their careers: Floyd Smith, Bill Inglis, Jim Schoenfeld, Craig Ramsay, Rick Dudley, Lindy Ruff and Phil Housley. In addition, two others, Ted Nolan and Dan Bylsma, played for the Rochester Americans at a time when the Americans were the Sabres' top minor-league affiliate.

The current head coach is Don Granato.

Key

Coaches

Coaches with multiple stints as head coach only count once in the official count of head coaches.

See also
List of NHL head coaches
List of current NHL captains and alternate captains
List of NHL players

References

 
Buffalo Sabres head coaches
coaches